Éva Tóth (12 November 1952 – 30 January 2013) was a Hungarian sprinter who competed in the 1980 Summer Olympics.

References

1952 births
2013 deaths
Hungarian female sprinters
Olympic athletes of Hungary
Athletes (track and field) at the 1980 Summer Olympics